Marquess Jing of Zhao (c. 410-375 BCE) was a ruler of the State of Zhao during the Warring States period of Chinese history (475-220 BCE). Born Zhào Zhāng, he was the son of Marquess Lie of Zhao. Zhào Wŭgōng (400-386 BCE) was the brother to Marquess Lie of Zhao and ruled until Zhào Zhāng was of age. 

In 386 BCE, the first year of his reign, Marquess Jing moved the Zhao capital from Zhōngmóu (中牟) (modern Tangyin County, Henan) to Hándān, Hebei (邯郸) where two large districts were set up to be in a more secure location. One of these was the administrative district Gōngchéng (宫城区) and the other the Dàbĕi commercial area (大北城) and Hándān quickly prospered.

In the second year of his reign Marquess Jing prevailed over the State of Qi at a battle that took place in the area between Gāotáng (高唐) and Chípíng (茌平).

Marquess Jing was succeeded by his son Marquess Cheng of Zhao.

References

Monarchs of Zhao (state)
Zhou dynasty nobility
4th-century BC Chinese monarchs
Zhao (state)